The Best of the Tennessee Yodeler is a studio album by American country music artist Margo Smith. It was first released in 1985 via Moon Shine Records and contained 14 tracks. It was re-released in 1987 in conjunction with Bermuda Dunes Records and MCA Records. Dedicated to one of Smith's childhood performing idols, The Best of the Tennessee Yodeler was the tenth studio album in her recording career. The project was sold on television in addition to being sold in record stores.

Background, content and release
Margo Smith had several years of commercial country music success during the late 1970s, including the number one hits "Don't Break the Heart That Loves You" and "It Only Hurts for a Little While". In 1982, she chose to leave her recording contract with Warner Bros. Records and began releasing music independently through her own record label, Cammeron Records. 

The Best of the Tennessee Yodeler was an album Smith chose to record in dedication to one of musical idols, country artist Bonnie Lou. The project was recorded between 1984 and 1985 in sessions co-produced by Andy Di Martino and husband Richard Cammeron. The album contained a total of 14 tracks. This included re-recordings of Smith's former country hits, such as "Take My Breath Away." Six of the album's material was composed by Smith herself, including two compositions co-written with former producer Norro Wilson and two with Richard Cammeron. Also included were cover versions of songs such as Hank Williams' "Lovesick Blues" and Patsy Montana's "I Want to Be a Cowboy's Sweetheart." Also featured were several tracks that showcased Smith's yodeling vocal skills, such as "He Taught Me How to Yodel".

The Best of the Tennessee Yodeler was first released on Moon Shine Records in 1985. It was originally issued as a vinyl LP containing seven tracks on either side of the record. In 1987, it was re-released in conjunction with Bermuda Dunes Records and MCA Records with an identical track listing. The 1987 released was also distributed as a vinyl LP. Following its release, the album was sold in record stores, but mostly sold on television. Infomercial advertisements were often seen by viewers on cable television.

Track listing

Original and re-release versions

Personnel
All credits are adapted from the original 1985 liner notes The Best of the Tennessee Yodeler.

Musical and technical personnel
 Richard Cammeron – Producer
 Dennis Carney – Cover photo
 Ken Kim – Art direction and graphics
 Andy Di Martino – Producer
 Margo Smith – Lead vocals
 Billy Strange – String arrangement
 Bill Vorndyck – Engineer

Release history

References

Footnotes

Books

 
 

1985 albums
MCA Records albums
Margo Smith albums